The Prince Claus Fund was established in 1996, named in honor of Prince Claus of the Netherlands. It receives an annual subsidy from the Dutch Ministry of Foreign Affairs.

The Fund has presented the international Prince Claus Awards annually since 1997 to honor individuals and organizations reflecting a progressive and contemporary approach to the themes of culture and development. Recipients are mainly located in Africa, Asia, Latin America, and the Caribbean.

The Prince Claus Awards

 Nominations

Honorees are determined by a jury of experts from fields relevant to its mission of culture and development.PCF, "About the Prince Claus Awards", op. cit.

 Criteria

The most important consideration of the jury is the positive effect of a laureate's work on a wider cultural or social field. The Prince Claus Fund interprets culture in a broad sense to encompass all kinds of artistic and intellectual disciplines, science, media and education.  Outstanding quality is an essential condition for an award.

 Awards presentation

The additional awards of  each are presented in the Dutch embassies in the countries where the recipients live in December and January.

 The Prince Claus Awards books

Every year, the Fund publishes a book including the awards speech by one of the Honorary Chairmen, an extract of the lecture by a leading thinker, the jury's report and extensive discussions of the laureates' work by experts qualified in the laureates' fields.

 List of previous awards books

The 1997 Prince Claus Awards

 Theme 

The winners of the 1997 awards embody the policy aims of the Prince Claus Fund: Exceptional work in the field of culture and development in Asia, Latin America and notably in Africa.

 Laureates 

 The Zimbabwe International Book Fair (Principal Award)
 Council for the Development of Social Science Research in Africa (CODESRIA) (Senegal)
 Index on Censorship (United Kingdom), organization for the freedom of speech
 Malangatana Ngwenya (Mozambique), artist painter and poet
 Joseph Hanson Kwabena Nketia (Ghana), ethnomusicologist and composer
 Sardono Waluyo Kusumo (Indonesia), choreographer, dancer and filmmaker
 Bruno Stagno (Chile/Costa Rica), architect
 Jim Supangkat (Indonesia), sculptor, art critic and curator
 Abdeljelil Temimi (Tunisia), historian
 Ernest Wamba dia Wamba (D.R. Congo/Tanzania), political philosopher

 Committee

Adriaan van der Staay, Lolle Nauta, Anil Ramdas.

The 1998 Prince Claus Awards

 Theme

"The Art of African Fashion"

 Laureates 

 Alphadi (Niger) (Principal Award), fashion designer
 Oumou Sy (Senegal) (Principal Award), fashion designer
 Tetteh Adzedu (Ghana) (Principal Award), fashion designer
 Rakhshan Bani-E'temad (Iran), filmmaker
 Heri Dono (Indonesia), artist painter, sculptor and installation artist
 Ticio Escobar (Paraguay), art critic, curator and museum director
 Jyotindra Jain (India), art and culture scientist
 Jean-Baptiste Kiéthéga (Burkina Faso), archeologist and historian
 David Koloane (South Africa), visual artist and curator
 Baaba Maal (Senegal), singer
 Carlos Monsiváis (Mexico), writer, philosopher and journalist
 Redza Piyadasa (Malaysia), artist and art critic
 Rogelio Salmona (Colombia), architect
 Kumar Shahani (India), filmmaker
 Tian Zhuangzhuang (China), filmmaker
 Nazik Saba Yared (Lebanon), writer, essayist and literature critic

 Committee

Adriaan van der Staay, Charles Correa, Emile Fallaux, Mai Ghoussoub, Gaston Kaboré, Gerardo Mosquera.

The 1999 Prince Claus Awards

 Theme 

"Creating Spaces of Freedom"

 Laureates 

 Mohand Fellag (France/Algeria) (Principal Award), comedian, actor and writer
 Vitral (Cuba) (Principal Award), socio-cultural magazine
 Al Jazeera (Qatar) (Principal Award), independent television network
 Patrick Chamoiseau (Martinique), writer
 Paulin J. Hountondji (Benin), philosopher
 Cildo Meireles (Brazil), sculptor, installation and conceptual artist
 Pepetela (Angola), writer
 Dessalegn Rahmato (Ethiopia), sociologist
 Juana Marta Rodas and Julia Isídrez (Paraguay), ceramics artists
 Claudia Roden (United Kingdom/Egypt), cookery book writer
 Cheick Oumar Sissoko (Mali), filmmaker
 Tsai Chih Chung (Taiwan), cartoonist, comic strip artist and cartoon filmmaker
 Ken Yeang (Malaysia), architect

 Committee

Adriaan van der Staay, Charles Correa, Emile Fallaux, Mai Ghoussoub, Gaston Kaboré, Gerardo Mosquera.

The 2000 Prince Claus Awards

 Theme

"Urban Heroes"

 Laureates 

 Jaime Lerner (Brazil) (Principal Award), architect
 Viva Rio (Brazil) (Principal Award), social work peace organization
 Francisco Toledo (Mexico) (Principal Award), artist painter
 Bush Radio (South Africa), independent radiostation
 Communalism Combat (India), human rights organization
 Cui Jian (China), singer-songwriter, trumpeter, guitarist and film actor
 Film Resource Unit (South Africa), independent film distributor
 Arif Hasan (Pakistan), architect, urban planner, socio-philosopher and poet
 Bhupen Khakhar (India), visual artist
 Komal Kothari (India), ethnomusicologist
 Werewere Liking (Ivory Coast), art painter, filmmaker and writer
 Ayu Utami (Indonesia), radio broadcaster and writer
 Van Leo (Egypt), photographer

 Committee

Adriaan van der Staay, Charles Correa, Emile Fallaux, Mai Ghoussoub, Gaston Kaboré, Gerardo Mosquera, Bruno Stagno.

The 2001 Prince Claus Awards

 Theme

"Carnival"

 Laureates 

 Summer Carnival, Rotterdam (Netherlands) (Principal Award), Caribbean carnival
 Peter Minshall, designer (Trinidad) (Principal Award), carnival costume designer
 Chris Abani (Nigeria), writer and poet
 Duong Thu Huong (Vietnam), writer
 Samuel Fosso (Cameroon), photographer
 Jahan-e Ketab (Iran), literary magazine
 Miri Maftun (Afghanistan), ethnomusicologist
 Antun Maqdisi (Syria), political philosopher
 Ibrahim el-Salahi (Sudan/United Kingdom), artist painter
 Elena Rivera Mirano (United States, Philippines), singer, choir leader and musicologist
 Talingo (Panama), cultural magazine
 Iván Thays (Peru), writer

 Committee

Adriaan van der Staay, Charles Correa, Mai Ghoussoub, Gaston Kaboré, Gerardo Mosquera, Bruno Stagno.

The 2002 Prince Claus Awards

 Theme

"Languages and transcultural forms of expression"

 Laureates 

 Mohamed Chafik (Morocco) (Principal Award), writer
 Marcelo Araúz Lavadenz (Bolivia), festival director, cultural promoter and choir leader
 Ali Farzat (Syria), cartoonist
 Ferreira Gullar (Brazil), writer and art critic
 Amira Hass (Israel), writer
 Institute for Islamic and Social Studies (Indonesia), human rights organization and study center
 Virginia Pérez-Ratton (Costa Rica), artist, art critic and curator
 Youssou N'Dour (Senegal), singer
 Walter Tournier (Uruguay), animation filmmaker
 Wu Liangyong (China), town-planner

 Committee

Adriaan van der Staay, Sadiq Jalal al-Azm, Aracy Amaral, Goenawan Mohamad, Pedro Pimenta, Claudia Roden, Bruno Stagno.

The 2003 Prince Claus Awards

 Theme

"The Survival and Innovation of Crafts"

 Laureates 

 Wang Shixiang (China) (Principal Award), art collector and poet
 The 2002 Arab Human Development Report from notably Nader Fergany (Egypt)
 Mathare Youth Sports Association (Kenya), development aid organization
 Carlinhos Brown (Brazil), singer-songwriter and percussionist
 Lita Stantic (Argentina), filmmaker
 District Six Museum (South Africa), museum on apartheid in South Africa
 Hasan Saltık (Turkey), music producer
 Mick Pearce (Zimbabwe), architect
 Reyum Institute of Arts and Culture (Cambodia), art and culture institute
 G. N. Devy (India), tribal researcher, writer and literary critic
 Yovita Meta (Indonesia), fashion designer and artisan

 Committee

Adriaan van der Staay, Aracy Amaral, Sadik Al-Azm, Goenawan Mohamad, Pedro Pimenta, Claudia Roden, Bruno Stagno.

The 2004 Prince Claus Awards

 Theme

"The positive results of Asylum and Migration"

 Laureates 

 Mahmoud Darwish (Palestine) (Principal Award), poet and writer
 Jawad al-Assadi (Iraq), theater maker and poet
 Tin Moe (Burma), poet
 Ivaldo Bertazzo (Brazil), dancer and choreographer
 Bhutan Archery Federation (Bhutan), cultural archery society
 Halet Çambel (Turkey), archeologist
 Omara Khan Massoudi (Afghanistan), museum director
 Memoria Abierta (Argentina), human rights organization
 Farroukh Qasim (Tajikistan), theater maker
 Aminata Traoré (Mali), writer and political activist

 Committee

Adriaan van der Staay, Aracy Amaral, Sadik Al-Azm, Goenawan Mohamad, Pedro Pimenta, Claudia Roden, Bruno Stagno.

The 2005 Prince Claus Awards

 Theme

"Humour and Satire"

 Laureates 

 Jonathan Shapiro, alias Zapiro (South Africa) (Principal Award), cartoonist
 Lenin El-Ramly (Egypt), writer and director
 Slamet Gundono (Indonesia), wayang puppeteer and artist
 Edgar Langeveldt (Zimbabwe), stand-up comedian, singer-songwriter and actor
 Michael Poghosyan (Armenia), actor, singer and cabaret performer
 Joaquín Salvador Lavado, alias Quino (Argentina), cartoonist and comic strip artist
 Ebrahim Nabavi (Iran), writer and satirist
 Chéri Samba (D.R. Congo), artist painter
 Niède Guidon (Brazil), archeologist
 Abdul Sheriff (Tanzania), museum director
 Opiyo Okach (Kenya), dancer and choreographer

 Committee

Niek Biegman, Aracy Amaral, Sadik Al-Azm, Goenawan Mohamad, Pedro Pimenta, Claudia Roden, Mick Pearce.

The 2006 Prince Claus Awards

 Theme

"10 years Prince Claus Awards" (recapitulating visual arts, writing and publishing, theater, cultural education and debate, cultural heritage and education)

 Laureates 

 Reza Abedini (Iran) (Principal Award), graphical artist and art critic
 Lida Abdul (Afghanistan), visual artist, videographer and photographer
 Christine Tohmé (Lebanon), curator and art promoter
 Erna Brodber (Jamaica), writer and sociologist
 Henry Chakava (Kenya), publisher
 Frankétienne (Haiti), writer, poet, dramatist, musician and artist painter
 Madeeha Gauhar (Pakistan), actress, writer, theater maker and women rights activist
 Michael Mel (Papua New Guinea), art scientist, curator, philosopher, musician and playwright
 Committee for Relevant Art (Nigeria), art platform
 Al Kamandjâti Association (Palestine), musical development organization
 National Museum of Mali, archeological and ethnological museum

 Committee 

Selma Al-Radi, Manthia Diawara, Pablo Ortiz Monasterio, Amitav Ghosh, Virginia Pérez-Ratton, Mick Pearce, Niek Biegman.

The 2007 Prince Claus Awards

 Theme

"Culture and Conflict"

 Laureates 
Faustin Linyekula (D.R. Congo) (Principal Award), dancer and choreographer
Patricia Ariza (Colombia), poet and actress
Augusto Boal (Brazil), theater maker
Emily Jacir (Palestine), visual artist
Hollis Liverpool, alias Chalkdust (British Virgin Islands), calypso singer and writer
Sudanese Writers Union (Sudan)
Ars Aevi (Bosnia and Herzegovina), museum of art
Oscar Hagerman (Mexico), architect and designer
Harutyun Khachatryan (Armenia), filmmaker
Godfrey Mwampembwa, alias Gado (Kenya), cartoonist
Radio Isanganiro (Burundi), human rights promoter and radio station

 Committee

Peter Geschiere, Manthia Diawara, Pablo Ortiz Monasterio, Mick Pearce, Virginia Pérez-Ratton, Selma Al-Radi.

The 2008 Prince Claus Awards 

 Theme

"Culture and the Human Body"

 Laureates

 Mamoni Raisom Goswami (India) (Principal Award), writer and poet
 Li Xianting (China), art critic
 Ganchugiyn Purevbat (Mongolia), artist painter, museum director and lama
 Ousmane Sow (Senegal), sculptor
 Dayanita Singh (India), photographer
 Elia Suleiman (Palestine), filmmaker
 James Iroha Uchechukwu (Nigeria), photographer
 Tania Bruguera (Cuba), visual artist
 Ma Ke (China), fashion designer
 Jeanguy Saintus (Haiti), dancer and choreographer
 Carlos Henríquez Consalvi (Venezuela/El Salvador), radio broadcaster and museum director

The 2009 Prince Claus Awards 

Theme

« Culture and Nature »

Laureates
 Simón Vélez - (Colombia) (Principal Award), architect
 El Anatsui - (Ghana), sculptor
 Doual'art - (Cameroon), art organization
 Liang Shaoji - (China), conceptual artist
 Jivya Soma Mashe - (India), visual artist
 Sammy Baloji - (D.R. Congo), photographer
 Santu Mofokeng - (South Africa), photographer
 Kanak Dixit - (Nepal), publisher and writer
 Institute of History of Nicaragua and Central America - (Nicaragua)
 Desiderio Navarro - (Cuba), art and culture critic
 Gastón Acurio - (Peru), cook and gastronomist

The 2010 Prince Claus Awards 
Theme

« Borders to reality  »

Laureates
Barzakh Editions (Algeria) (Principal Award), independent publisher
Decolonizing Architecture institute (DAi, Palestine), architectonic institute
Jia Zhangke (China), filmmaker, actor and writer
Kwani Trust (Kenya), literary platform and magazine
Ana Maria Machado (Brazil), painter and writer
Yoani Sánchez (Cuba), blogger and human rights activist
Maya Goded (Mexico), photographer
Kasmalieva & Djumaliev (Kyrgyzstan), visual artist couple
Dinh Q. Lê (Vietnam), visual artist and photographer
Mehrdad Oskouei (Iran), documentary maker
Aung Zaw (Thailand), publisher

The 2011 Prince Claus Awards 

Theme

« Breaking taboos »

Laureates
Ntone Edjabe for Chimurenga (Pan-Africa) (Principal Award), DJ, writer and publisher
Said Atabekov, (Kazakhstan), visual artist, videographer and photographer
The Book Café, (Zimbabwe), platform for free cultural expression
Nidia Bustos, (Nicaragua), cultural activist and theatre director
Rena Effendi, (Azerbaijan), photographer
Regina José Galindo, (Guatemala), body and performance artist
Ilkhom Theatre, (Uzbekistan), independent theater
Kettly Mars, (Haiti), poet and writer
Rabih Mroué, (Lebanon), theater maker and visual artist
Riwaq, (Palestine), architectonic organization
Woeser, (Tibet; China), writer, poet and blogger

The 2012 Prince Claus Awards 

Theme

«Frontiers of Reality »

Laureates
Eloísa Cartonera  (Argentina) (Principal Award), co-operation of designers and writers
Sami Ben Gharbia, (Tunisia), internet activist
Habiba Djahnine, (Algeria), film producer, film festival curator and essayist
Yassin al-Haj Saleh, (Syria), writer and dissident
Widad Kawar, (Jordan), collector and researcher of Arab clothing and jewellery
Teresa Margolles, (Mexico), photographer, videographer and performance artist
Boniface Mwangi, (Kenya), press photographer and peace activist
Phare Ponleu Selpak, (Cambodia), cultural community organization
Ian Randle, (Jamaica), independent publisher
Maung Thura, alias Zarganar, (Burma), comedian and filmmaker
Mohamed Ibrahim Warsame, alias Hadraawi, (Somaliland/Somalia), poet and songwriter

The 2013 Prince Claus Awards 

Laureates
Ahmed Fouad Negm, (Egypt) (Principal Award), poet and critic
Alejandro Zambra, (Chile), writer
Carla Fernández, (Mexico), fashion designer and cultural historian
Christopher Cozier, (Trinidad and Tobago), multi-media artist and cultural activator
Idrissou Mora-Kpaï, (Benin), documentary filmmaker
Lu Guang, (China), photographer
Naiza Khan, (Pakistan), visual artist
Recycled Orchestra of Cateura, (Paraguay), youth orchestra
Óscar Muñoz, (Colombia), visual artist
Teater Garasi, (Indonesia), performing arts
Zanele Muholi, (South Africa), photographer and visual activist

The 2014 Prince Claus Awards 

Laureates

 Ignacio Agüero (Chile), (Principal Award), filmmaker
 Rosina Cazali, (Guatemala), writer and curator
 Lav Diaz, (Philippines), filmmaker
 FX Harsono, (Indonesia), visual artist
 Gülsün Karamustafa, (Turkey), visual artist
 Tran Luong, (Vietnam), media artist
 Museo Itinerante Arte por la Memoria, (Peru), art collective
 Lia Rodrigues, (Brazil), choreographer
 SPARROW Sound & Picture Archives for Research on Women, (India), women's archive

The 2015 Prince Claus Awards 

Laureates

 Newsha Tavakolian (Iran), (Principal Award), photojournalist
 Latif Al-Ani (Iraq), photographer
 Amakhosi (Zimbabwe), community-oriented theatre group and cultural hub
 Jelili Atiku (Nigeria), performance artist
 Jean Pierre Bekolo (Cameroon), filmmaker
 ETCETERA (Argentina/Chile), art collective
 Perhat Khaliq (China), musician and singer-songwriter
 Fatos Lubonja (Albania), author, editor and public intellectual
 Ossama Mohammed (Syria), filmmaker
 Oksana Shatalova (Kazakhstan), visual artist and curator
 Y'en A Marre (Senegal), collective of young musicians and journalists

Committee

Bregtje van der Haak, Suad Amiry, Salah Hassan, Kettly Mars, Ong Ken Sen, Gabriela Salgado

The 2016 Prince Claus Awards 

Laureates

 Apichatpong Weerasethakul (Thailand), (Principal Award), filmmaker
 Kamal Mouzawak (Lebanon), chef and food activist
 The Second Floor (T2F) (Pakistan), interdisciplinary cultural centre
 Bahia Shehab (Egypt/Lebanon), graphic designer, artist, educator
 La Silla Vacía (The Empty Chair) (Colombia), interactive online portal
 Vo Trong Nghia (Vietnam), architect

 Committee

Emile Fallaux, Sheikha Hoor Al Qasimi, Dinh Q Lê, Visual Artist, Neo Muyanga, Manuel de Rivero, Suely Rolnik

The 2017 Prince Claus Awards 

Laureates

 Vincent Carelli (Brazil) (Principal Award), filmmaker
 Ma Jun (China) (Principal Award), environmental activist
 Khadija Al-Salami (filmmaker, Yemen)
 L’Art Rue (art collective, Tunisia)
 Brigitte Baptiste (scientist, Colombia)
 Amar Kanwar (film director, India)
 Diébédo Francis Kéré (architect, Burkina Faso)

The 2018 Prince Claus Awards 
Theme ‘Louder than Words’
New, the Next Generation Award, which honours an outstanding creative initiative that contributes positively to the lives and possibilities of young people.  
Laureates
Market Photo Workshop, (South Africa), (Principal Award), Training institute and cultural platform
Dada Masilio South Africa) (Next Generation Award)(dancer and choreographer)
Adong Judith (playwright, film and theatre-maker, Uganda)
Marwa al-Sabouri (architect and urban thinker, Syria)
Kidlat Tahimik (artist in many disciplines, Philippines) 
Eka Kurniawan (writer, Indonesia), 
O Menelick 2 Ato (independent platform, Brazil)

The 2019 Prince Claus Awards 

Kamala Ibrahim Ishaq, (Sudan) (Principal Award)
 Ambulante (documentaries, Mexico)
 Mariam Kamara (architect, Niger) 
 Bill Kouélany (artist & writer, Congo-Brazzaville)
 Djamila Ribeiro (philosopher, Brazilië)
 Anocha Suwichakornpong (filmmaker, Thailand)
 Mónica Ojeda Franco (writer, Ecuador), Next Generation Laureate

The 2020 Prince Claus Awards 
Ibrahim Mahama, (Ghana, Visual Arts) (Principal Award)
Açik Radyo, (Turkey, Media)
Diamantina Arcoiris, (Colombia, Design)
Fendika Cultural Center, (Ethiopia, Music and performance)
Tunakaimanu Fielakepa, (Tonga, Cultural Heritage)
m7red, (Argentina, Architecture).

References
Awards per year and profiles starting from here

External links
 

Dutch awards
Awards established in 1996